Jamie Hickox (born 8 February 1964) is a former English and Canadian professional squash player.

Jamie was born on 8 February 1964 in Canada before moving to England. He became the 1983 British Junior Open Squash Under-19 champion. In 1986, he became the Canadian Squash Champion and competed in the Men's World Open Squash Championship. John Furlong, whose professional biographies claim he was the Canadian champion, was an age group winner in 1986.

Hickox has represented both England and Canada at International level. In 2011 he became the new Performance Director for Squash Canada after previously coaching the Malaysian National squad.

References

External links
 

1964 births
Living people
English male squash players
Canadian male squash players